Carlos Carrasco may refer to:
Carlos Carrasco (actor) (born 1948), American actor
Carlos Carrasco (baseball) (born 1987), Venezuelan baseball pitcher
Carlos Carrasco (footballer) (born 1993), Spanish footballer